MESI  is a measuring medical devices manufacturer. They develop and produce medical devices for diagnostics purposes and are the maker of MESI mTABLET, a predictive medical assessment platform for healthcare with extensive AI.

History
MESI was founded in 2009 by Jakob Šušterič, an electrical engineering student at the University of Ljubljana in Slovenia. The company is based in Slovenia, with a branch in London.

X Prize Competition
Their design of a wristband that collects individual's data and a smartphone application which sends it to a physician who can then prescribe therapy based on a broader range of information, won the company a finalist place in the Tricorder X PRIZE competition.

Notes

References

External links

Manufacturing companies of Slovenia
Manufacturing companies established in 2009
Mobile software
Slovenian companies established in 2009